is a Japanese management and entertainment company founded by the six original members of Japanese boy group Exile in 2003. The president is Hiroyuki Igarashi, the leader of the Exile. The name "LDH" is an acronym of "Love + Dream + Happiness". The company operates several boy bands and girl groups and a talent school named "EXPG".

In January 2017, the company changed its name to LDH Japan and established overseas branches in United States, Asia, and Europe. They established a new company called LDH World, the parent company of the four branches. For LDH World, Hiro took on the role of chief creative officer, while Verbal, NIGO and Dr. Romanelli (aka DRx) were appointed as executive creative directors. Masataka Mori was appointed as the CEO of LDH Japan, Makoto Matsuda as the CEO of LDH Asia, Afrojack as the CEO of LDH Europe and Hirotaka Mori as the CEO of LDH USA.

Artists

Groups 

 Exile
 Exile The Second
 Sandaime J Soul Brothers from Exile Tribe
 Generations from Exile Tribe
 The Rampage from Exile Tribe
 Fantastics from Exile Tribe
 Ballistik Boyz from Exile Tribe
 Psychic Fever from Exile Tribe
 Gekidan Exile
 Happiness
 Doberman Infinity
 DEEP SQUAD
 M-Flo
 Honest Boyz
 Girls²
 Oha Girl from Girls²
 Lucky²
 iScream
 LIL LEAGUE

Soloists 

 Exile Atsushi
 Exile Takahiro
 Exile Shokichi
 Dream Ami
 Dream Shizuka
 Hiroomi Tosaka
 Ryuji Imaichi
 Takanori Iwata
 CrazyBoy
 Sway
 Verbal
 Crystal Kay
 Jay'ed
 Miyavi
 Sho Aoyagi
 Rei

Actors 
 Akihisa Shiono
 Yuki Sakurai
 Kentaro Maeda
 Hayato Onozuka
 Kanta Sato
 Keita Machida
 Yuzuki Hirakawa
 Taichi Saotome
 Nobuyuki Suzuki
 Anna Ishii
 Nonoka Yamaguchi
 Nozomi Bando
 Karen Fujii
 Yuta Ozawa
 Shintaro Akiyama
 Masayasu Yagi
 Don Lee
 Sho Aoyagi
 MATSU
 Toshiki Noiri
 Kousei Amano
 Kyosuke Kurokawa

Former 

 Love
 Dream
 ShuuKaRen
 Dance Earth Party
 Flower
 SudannaYuzuYully
 E-girls
 E.G.family
 mirage²
 lovely²
 Sayaka Shionoya
 Rootless

EXPG 

EXPG Studio is a talent school that trains people who want to become artists in the field of dancing, singing, acting or modelling. The name "EXPG" is an acronym for "Exile Professional Gym", deriving from its founders.

The first EXPG Studio opened in October 2003 in Tokyo and since then the schools expanded around the globe. There are currently 12 schools at different locations in Japan, 3 schools located in other countries (2 in the USA and 1 in Taiwan) and an online school.

In 2019, LDH announced EXPG High School in collaboration with Kadokawa Dwango Gakuen N High School. The school allows pupils to earn a high school diploma while studying class. Exile Tetsuya serves as chancellor.

References

External links 

 LDH

Entertainment companies established in 2003
Talent agencies based in Tokyo
Japanese companies established in 2003
Meguro
LDH (company) artists
Japanese talent agencies